Yuliana Pérez Martinéz (born July 21, 1981 in Tucson, Arizona) is an American triple jumper of Cuban heritage. Holding a dual citizenship to compete internationally, she attained two U.S. outdoor championship titles (2002 and 2003) in the triple jump, picked up a silver medal at the 2003 Pan American Games in Santo Domingo, Dominican Republic, and finished twenty-eighth at the 2004 Summer Olympics.

Early life
Born in Tucson, Arizona to Cuban immigrants, Perez spent most of her early childhood in adversity. Her father Juan Carlos Martinez Vallez was arrested upon his arrival in the United States for criminal charges, and thereby sentenced to life imprisonment in Georgia; her mother Osmayda Pérez was killed by a stray bullet under obscure circumstances in a neighborhood shooting in San Diego, California. Following her mother's untimely demise, Perez and her two younger brothers bounced around homes for a couple of years, before being sent back to Havana, Cuba, to live with their paternal grandmother.

While residing in Cuba throughout her childhood and teenage years, Perez developed herself into one of the country's most promising young athletes, taking three high school championship titles and a silver medal in the triple jump from the 1997 Junior Pan American Games. In late 1999, Perez dropped from the Cuban sports program after she refused to forego her American citizenship in exchange for the possible trip to the 2000 Summer Olympics in Sydney as part of the Cuban squad.

Upon her arrival to the United States in early 2000 with just a backpack full of clothes and a reservation at a foster home, Perez left herself meager, jobless, and inarticulate in English, until she was befriended by social worker Cruz Olivarria, who invited to live with her in downtown Tucson. Working initially as a waitress, Perez restarted her athletic career through a series of radiant gestures from strangers that quickly helped her enroll on a sports scholarship at Pima Community College.

Career
On that same year, Perez had a golden opportunity to represent the United States on her international debut at the 2001 Summer Universiade in Beijing, China, where she nearly missed out the podium with a fourth-place finish in the same event.

As the 2003 season had commenced, Perez exhausted her eligibility at Pima upon receiving her undergraduate college degree, and then transferred to the University of Arizona to train full-time with head coach Fred Harvey for the Arizona Wildcats.

Two months later, Perez did not reach the final round of the women's triple jump at the IAAF World Championships in Paris, France, but redeemed her strength to capture the silver medal at the Pan American Games in Santo Domingo, the Dominican Republic with a jump of 13.99 metres.

Perez entered the 2004 Summer Olympics in Athens on her official debut, as a member of the U.S. Olympic track and field team, in the women's triple jump. Perez got off to a rough start with a foul on her opening attempt but managed to jump 13.62 m as a top qualifying mark on her second attempt. Since her third jump was slightly shorter than her best result by eleven centimeters, Perez ended up in twenty-eighth place out of thirty-three athletes and did not advance past the qualifying round.

Outside of her college track and field career, Perez also trained for Tucson Elite Athletic Club under legendary coach Dick Booth.

References

External links
 
 Profile at USA Track & Field
 Player Bio – Arizona Wildcats

1981 births
Living people
Sportspeople from Tucson, Arizona
American female triple jumpers
Olympic track and field athletes of the United States
Athletes (track and field) at the 2004 Summer Olympics
Pan American Games track and field athletes for the United States
Pan American Games medalists in athletics (track and field)
Pan American Games silver medalists for the United States
Athletes (track and field) at the 2003 Pan American Games
World Athletics Championships athletes for the United States
Cuban emigrants to the United States
Pima Community College alumni
Arizona Wildcats women's track and field athletes
Medalists at the 2003 Pan American Games